Cabbage tree is a common name for several plant species:

 Andira inermis, native to Central and South America
 Various members of the genus Cordyline native to New Zealand.
Cordyline australis (Cabbage tree)
Cordyline banksii (Forest cabbage tree)
Cordyline indivisa (Mountain cabbage tree, Broad-leaved cabbage tree)
Cordyline obtecta (Three Kings cabbage tree, native also to Norfolk Island, where it is known as Norfolk Island cabbage tree)
Cordyline pumilio (Dwarf cabbage tree, Pygmy cabbage tree)
 Cussonia spicata, native to southern parts of Africa
 Dendroseris litoralis, native to Chile's Juan Fernandez archipelago
 Gyrocarpus americanus 
 Livistona australis, the Cabbage tree palm of coastal New South Wales
 Moringa stenopetala, a crop tree native to Ethiopia and Kenya
 Various members of the Asteraceae from Saint Helena
Pladaroxylon leucadendron (He cabbage tree - so called because its leaves are hairy)
Lachanodes arborea (She cabbage tree - so called because its leaves are not hairy)
Melanodendron integrifolium (Black cabbage tree)

See also
 Cabbage Tree Island
 Cabbage Palm (disambiguation)

References